Teddington may refer to any of the following:

Places
 Teddington – a town in west London
 Teddington, Gloucestershire – a town in Gloucestershire
 Teddington, New Zealand – a small community at the head of Lyttelton Harbour, New Zealand
 Teddington, Queensland – a locality in Queensland Australia
 Teddington Park – a neighbourhood in Toronto, Canada

Others
 Teddington (horse) a racehorse in the late 19th century